San Isidro is a district of the Lima Province in Peru. It is located in the west center of the city, it has a few meters of coastline. Officially created on April 24, 1931, San Isidro, along with Orrantia and Country Club districts, was separated from Miraflores.

San Isidro has become a major financial quarter in recent years, as many banks and businesses left downtown Lima to set up their headquarters in modern office blocks. It is inhabited by mostly upper middle and upper-class families.

Geography
The district has a total land area of 9.78 km2. Its administrative center is located at 109 meters above sea level.

Boundaries

 North: La Victoria, Lince and Jesús María
 East: San Borja
 South: Miraflores and Surquillo
 West: Magdalena del Mar and the Pacific Ocean

For more than fifty years, the border at the western area of the district has been disputed with neighboring Magdalena del Mar. A judge ordered the councils of both districts to deposit the money of the affected areas' taxpayers in the National Bank of Peru until this long-standing conflict is resolved.

Demographics
According to a 2002 estimate by the INEI, the district has 68,438 inhabitants and a population density of 6,165.6 persons/km2. In 1999, there were 20,598 households in the district.

Culture
San Isidro prides itself on being home to many Peruvian artists. A few museums, as well as the Wak'a Wallamarka, a pre-Inca burying temple which dates back to the 4th century where concerts and exhibitions are held occasionally, showing the cultural heritage of the district.

Notable residents of San Isidro have include painter Fernando de Szyszlo, former president Pedro Pablo Kuczynski, Javier Perez de Cuellar, José Antonio García Belaúnde, and Francisco Tudela, among others.

Trivia
 There are 58 embassies and consulates in San Isidro, which are Algeria, Australia, Austria, Azerbaijan, Bolivia, Chile, China, Colombia, Costa Rica, Cuba, Czech Republic, Dominican Republic, Ecuador, Egypt, El Salvador, Finland, France, Greece, Honduras, Hungary, India, Indonesia, Israel, Jamaica, Malaysia, Mexico, Morocco, New Zealand, Nicaragua, North Korea, Norway, Panama, Poland, Portugal, Romania, Russia, Serbia, Slovakia, Slovenia, South Africa, Spain, Sweden, Switzerland, Thailand, Turkey, Ukraine and Uruguay.
 The , the second tallest building in Peru is located in the district together with the third, its twin tower sister belonging to Grupo Brescia (it is not very well known that the tallest building in Peru is the Banco de la Nacion new building at San Borja, District). Other tall buildings, such as the T Tower are also present in the district.
 Lima's most important avenues (Javier Prado and Paseo de la República), criss-cross the district.
 With 21 bank headquarters and 50 agencies, San Isidro is the financial center of Peru.
 Monuments to Peruvian heroes and other world personalities (Gandhi, John Paul II, etc.)
 There are 15 Catholic Churches, synagogues and temples of other religions.

References

External links
  Municipalidad de San Isidro – San Isidro District Council official website
  PUCP – Centro Cultural – Cultural Center of the Pontifical Catholic University of Peru, located on

Districts of Lima
Financial districts
Diplomatic districts
1930 establishments in Peru